Carlos Henrique Alves Pereira (born 27 February 1995), known as Carlos Henrique, is a Brazilian footballer who plays for FC Cascavel as a forward.

Club career
Born in Sorriso, Mato Grosso, Carlos was released from Internacional in 2012, after leaving the club's training camp to go to a party. After eight months out of the fields he moved to Coritiba, but after failing to adapt with the city, joined Juventude.

In 2014 Carlos signed for Veranópolis, making his senior debuts in that year's Campeonato Gaúcho. After the end of the tournament he joined Figueirense, returning to youth setup.

Carlos was promoted to the main squad of Figueira in 2015 by manager Argel Fucks, and made his Série A debut on 10 May, coming on as a second-half substitute for Nirley in a 1–4 away loss against Sport.

References

External links
Carlos Henrique at playmakerstats.com (English version of ogol.com.br)

1995 births
Living people
Sportspeople from Mato Grosso
Brazilian footballers
Association football forwards
Campeonato Brasileiro Série A players
Campeonato Brasileiro Série B players
Campeonato Brasileiro Série C players
Campeonato Brasileiro Série D players
Veranópolis Esporte Clube Recreativo e Cultural players
Luverdense Esporte Clube players
Figueirense FC players
Sinop Futebol Clube players
Paraná Soccer Technical Center players
Londrina Esporte Clube players
Sport Club do Recife players
Grêmio Novorizontino players
Esporte Clube Juventude players